Chhodon Naa Yaar is a 2007 Bollywood horror film directed by Dillip Sood and starring Jimmy Sheirgill and Kim Sharma. The film is an adaptation of the 1999 American horror film The Blair Witch Project.

Plot

Ravi (Jimmy Sheirgill), Shiv (Kabir Sadanand) and Sunny (Farid Amiri), three final year students from a Delhi Mass Com College decided to make their diploma film about a myth which was prevalent in the northern hills of India. But, they did not know that the myth would turn out to be the truth.

Ravi planned the trip against the wishes of his girlfriend Rashmi (Kim Sharma) and college professor Saxena (Ahmed Khan) as both of them thought it to be a dangerous trip. However, Sunny eagerly joined the trip considering it as a fun trip. It was surely fun when they began ... But as they got deeper into the jungle their courage and beliefs were put to test.

Cast
Kim Sharma as Rashmi
Jimmy Sheirgill as Ravi Prasad
Farid Amiri as Sunny
Kabir Sadanand as Shiv Kapoor
Ahmed Khan as Saxena
Sri Vallabh Vyas
Vinod Nagpal
 Mahek Chahal

Soundtrack
The album was composed by Anand Raj Anand and Ranjit Barot. The lyrics were wrriten by Panchi Jalonvi and Anand Raj Anand. It has 9 tracks.

1. Talwar Re - Sunidhi Chauhan, Daler Mehndi
2. Kasak - Anand Raj Anand 
3. Jhoom Le -  Sunidhi Chauhan  
4. Zindagi - Shaan  
5. Chhodon Naa Yaar - Sharib Sabri, Ujjaini Mukherjee 
6. Luta Hai Zamane Ne - Sukhwinder Singh 
7. Talwar Re (Remix) - Anand Raj Anand, Sunidhi Chauhan, Daler Mehndi
8. Chhodon Naa Yaar (Remix) - Anand Raj Anand
9. Talwar Re (Dhol Mix) -  Sunidhi Chauhan, Daler Mehndi

References

External links

Chhodon Naa Yaar at BollywoodHungama

2007 films
2000s Hindi-language films
2000s horror drama films
2007 horror films
Films scored by Anand Raj Anand
Films scored by Ranjit Barot
Indian horror drama films
2007 drama films